Moju River may refer to
 Moju River (Acará), a river in the east of the state of Pará, Brazil
 Moju dos Campos River, a river in the west of the state of Pará, Brazil